Chuen Kee Ferry Ltd is a licensed ferry operator in Hong Kong. It operates the Aberdeen via Mo Tat Wan to Sok Kwu Wan route. Chuen Kee has been established for 50 years. The company's office is located at G/F, 17, Second Street, Sok Kwu Wan, Lamma Island, Hong Kong.

History
In the 1950s, company founder Mr. Wu Chuen purchased a sailing-ship to transport Lamma Island's residents to Aberdeen. Today the company uses a kaito for its services.

Routes
It currently operates the following routes:
 Aberdeen via Mo Tat Wan to Sok Kwu Wan

References

External links

Official website

Ferry transport in Hong Kong
Transport operators of Hong Kong